Nazarabad is a city in Alborz Province, Iran.

Nazarabad may also refer to:

Azerbaijan
Nəzərabad, a village in Azerbaijan

Iran

Alborz Province
Nazarabad, a city in Alborz Province
Nazarabad, Karaj, a village in Karaj County, Alborz Province
Nazarabad County, an administrative subdivision of Alborz Province

Chaharmahal and Bakhtiari Province
Nazarabad, Chaharmahal and Bakhtiari, a village in Kuhrang County

Fars Province
Nazarabad, Jahrom, a village in Jahrom County
Nazarabad, Sarvestan, a village in Sarvestan County

Gilan Province
Nazarabad, Gilan, a village in Astara County

Golestan Province
Nazarabad, Golestan, a village in Gorgan County

Hormozgan Province
Nazarabad, Hormozgan, a village in Rudan County, Hormozgan Province

Isfahan Province
Nazarabad, Isfahan, a village in Semirom County

Kerman Province
Nazarabad, Kerman, a village in Narmashir County

Kermanshah Province
Nazarabad-e Olya, a village in Kermanshah County

Kohgiluyeh and Boyer-Ahmad Province
Nazarabad, Kohgiluyeh and Boyer-Ahmad, a village in Dana County

Lorestan Province
Nazarabad, alternate name of Cham Zel-e Shahali, a village in Lorestan Province, Iran
Nazarabad, Delfan, a village in Lorestan Province, Iran
Nazarabad, Selseleh, a village in Lorestan Province, Iran

Razavi Khorasan Province
Nazarabad, Dargaz, a village in Dargaz County
Nazarabad, Khoshab, a village in Khoshab County
Nazarabad, Mashhad, a village in Mashhad County

Tehran Province
Nazarabad, Rey, a village in Tehran Province, Iran
Nazarabad, Varamin, a village in Tehran Province, Iran

West Azerbaijan Province
Nazarabad, West Azerbaijan, a village in Salmas County
Nazarabad-e Eftekhar, a village in Urmia County
Nazarabad Qaleh, a village in Urmia County